Kentucky Route 404 (KY 404) is a  state highway in the U.S. state of Kentucky. The highway connects mostly rural areas of Magoffin and Floyd counties with Prestonsburg.

Route description

Magoffin County
KY 404 begins at an intersection with KY 7 (Licking River Road) southeast of Arthurmabel, in the southeastern part of Magoffin County. It travels to the east-southeast, paralleling Howard Branch, and crosses over Bear Branch. It curves to the east-northeast and stops paralleling the branch when it ends. The highway curves to the northeast and enters Floyd County.

Floyd County
KY 404 winds its way to the east-southeast and crosses over Lick Fork. It begins paralleling the fork and enters David. There, it crosses over the fork again. It then curves to the east-northeast. It crosses over the fork again and curves to the east. It enters Goodloe, where it intersects the northern terminus of KY 850. Here, Lick Fork merges into the Left Fork Middle Creek, and KY 404 begins paralleling it. The highway intersects the northern terminus of KY 1210 (Caney Fork Road) and crosses over Buckeye Branch before it travels through Blue River. It crosses over Sam Hale and Blue River branches and then enters the far western part of Prestonsburg. There, it crosses over Middle Creek and meets its eastern terminus, an intersection with KY 114.

Major intersections

See also

References

0404
Transportation in Magoffin County, Kentucky
Transportation in Floyd County, Kentucky